Alcaide is a Spanish name, meaning 'castle commander'. It is borrowed from the Arabic term , which literally means 'commander'.

Etymology 
The Spanish form is alcayde whereas Portuguese form is alcaide.

Notable people 

 Anselmo Pardo Alcaide (1913-1977), Spanish entomologist.
 Chris Alcaide (1922–2004) American actor
 Carmen Alcayde (born 1973), Spanish TV presenter and actress
 David Alcaide (born 1978), Spanish pool player
 Guillermo Alcaide (born 1986), Spanish tennis player
 Ana Alcaide (born 1976), Spanish musician
 Pepe Alcaide (born 1979), Spanish footballer
 Víctor Aguirre Alcaide (born 1972), Mexican politician

References